Damba  is a town and a  municipality in Uíge Province in Angola. The municipality had a population of 66,472 in 2014.

It is served by Damba Airport.

References

Populated places in Uíge Province
Municipalities of Angola